Put Your Money Where Your Mouth Is is a BBC television series that was first shown on BBC One from 10 March 2008 to 18 June 2010, then shown on BBC Two from 14 February 2011 to 13 May 2012 where it aired its Food spin-off from 5 May to 5 June 2009 and then shown back on BBC One from 18 February 2013 to 19 May 2017 where it also aired its Chefs spin-off from 8 to 26 April 2013.

Transmissions

Original series

Food

Chefs

External links

Chefs: Put Your Menu Where Your Mouth Is

2008 British television series debuts
2017 British television series endings
BBC Television shows
English-language television shows